Gittenbergeria is a genus of air-breathing land snails, terrestrial pulmonate gastropod mollusks in the subfamily Gittenbergeriinae  of the family Trissexodontidae.

Species
Species within the genus Gittenbergeria include:
 Gittenbergeria turriplana (Morelet, 1845)

References

 Bank, R. A. (2017). Classification of the Recent terrestrial Gastropoda of the World. Last update: July 16th, 2017

External links
 

Trissexodontidae
Taxonomy articles created by Polbot